Joseph Drapeau (April 13, 1752 – November 3, 1810) was a seigneur, merchant and political figure in Lower Canada. He represented Northumberland in the Legislative Assembly of Lower Canada from 1809 to 1810.

He was born in Pointe-Lévy, the son of Pierre Drapeau and Marie-Joseph Huard, dit Désilets. Drapeau moved to Quebec City during the 1770s. In 1779, he obtained a permit to sell alcoholic beverages and, in 1781, a hotel-keeper's licence. He also operated a general store in the Lower Town of Quebec City and supplied goods to merchants Louis Bourdages and Louis Bélair. Drapeau married Marie-Geneviève Noël, the daughter of the seigneur of Tilly, in 1782. He was an officer in the militia and served during the American invasion of 1795–1796. In 1799, he owned a shipbuilding yard at Baie-Saint-Paul. He was able to acquire the seigneuries of Champlain, Lessard (also known as Pointe-au-Père), Rimouski and Saint-Barnabé, Grand-Métis, Pachot (also known as Rivière-Mitis) and Sainte-Claire. After selling part of his holdings, Drapeau then purchased half of the seigneury of Île-d'Orléans. For a time, he also owned a small portion of the seigneuries of Rigaud-Vaudreuil, Gentilly, Perthuis, Beauvais, Rivière-Duchesne, and Sainte-Barbe-de-la-Famine. He died in office in Quebec City at the age of 58.

His grandson Ulric-Joseph Tessier served in the legislative assembly for the Province of Canada and the Canadian senate and was also mayor of Quebec City.

References 
 

1752 births
1810 deaths
Members of the Legislative Assembly of Lower Canada
People from Lévis, Quebec